The Calvert Marine Museum is a maritime museum located in Solomons, Maryland.

The museum has three main themes:
 regional paleontology,
 estuarine life of the Patuxent River and Chesapeake Bay,
 maritime history.

Among its exhibits are the Drum Point Light, the bugeye Wm. B. Tennison, and the J. C. Lore Oyster House; the latter two are National Historic Landmarks. It also houses artifacts from the old Cedar Point Light, and maintains the Drum Point Light and grounds.

The museum also features several aquatic exhibits including an outdoor habitat for their North American river otters, and indoor aquarium exhibits for the sting ray, skates, the non-native lionfish, and numerous other species native to the Chesapeake Bay and its tributaries.

See also
List of maritime museums in the United States
List of museum ships

External Links
Official website

References

Museums established in 1970
Maritime museums in Maryland
Museums in Calvert County, Maryland
Aquaria in Maryland
Lighthouse museums in Maryland
Institutions accredited by the American Alliance of Museums
Solomons, Maryland
1970 establishments in Maryland